Stephen Adei (born 14 December 1948) is a Ghanaian economist, administrator and writer who is a former  Director General and Rector of the Ghana Institute of Management and Public Administration. He is a former chairperson of the National Development Planning Commission (NDPC) under the Nana Akufo-Addo government.

Early life and education 
He was born in the village of Hwiremoase, in Adansi, Ashanti, Ghana to Kwaku Adei and Abena Pomaa (aka Bedito). Adei attended primary school in the village's Methodist Primary school and nearby United Middle School in Brofuyedru. 

He is the fourth child of his mother's seven surviving all male children. from basic school education, he obtained a four year Teacher's Certificate in 1964 from the Sefwi Wiawso Training College. 

He studied privately to gain London University Ordinary and Advanced Level General Certificates in Education (High School equivalent qualifications) in three and a half years. Adei proceeded to the University of Ghana in October 1968 where he read economics, Sociology and Geography obtaining honours in all three first-year subjects before going on to do a BSc Honours programme in Economics. He then went to Strathclyde for his master's degree in Development Economics. He also holds a PhD in International Economics at the University of Sydney.

Career 
Stephen Adei was the Director General and the Rector of the Ghana Institute of Management and Public Administration (GIMPA) between January, 2000 and December 2008. Under his leadership, GIMPA was transformed from a small, under-resourced and subverted Institute in 1999 to the most successful organization under the Government of Ghana’s Public Sector reform.  

He was the Senior Economist of the Commonwealth Secretariat, London (1986-1989). He also serves as the board chairman of the Ghana Revenue Authority having been sworn in by the Finance Minister of Ghana; Ken Ofori-Atta.

Awards 

 Order of the Volta Companion of Ghana 
 Leadership Excellence Award
 Fellow and Patron of the Chartered Institute of Marketing (FCIMG)
 Doctor of Letters from GIMPA

References

Heads of schools in Ghana
Living people
Ghanaian writers
Ghanaian male writers
University of Sydney alumni
20th-century Ghanaian economists
Alumni of the University of Strathclyde
1948 births
School founders
People from Ashanti Region
People from Accra
Vice-Chancellors of universities in Ghana
Academic staff of Ghana Institute of Management and Public Administration
21st-century Ghanaian economists